Neohebestola luchopegnai is a species of beetle in the family Cerambycidae. It was described by Martins and Galileo in 1989. It is known from Chile.

References

Forsteriini
Beetles described in 1989
Endemic fauna of Chile